Larcom is a surname. Notable people with the surname include:

 Thomas Larcom (1801–1879), Irish politician and surveyor
 Lucy Larcom (1824–1893), American teacher, poet, and author
 Larcom Baronets